Holt is a former municipality in the old Aust-Agder county in Norway.  The  municipality existed from 1838 until its dissolution in 1960 when it was merged into the present-day municipality of Tvedestrand which is now in Agder county.  The administrative centre of Holt was located just south of the village of Fiane where Holt Church is located.

Holt Church probably dates from the twelfth century and has an ancient baptismal font. The interior was decorated by Torsten Hoff. The Nordkalottruta trail runs through the Holt area in Tvedestrand.

History
The parish of Holt was established as a civil municipality on 1 January 1838 (see formannskapsdistrikt law). According to the 1835 census, the municipality had a population of 3,116. 

On 1 January 1881, a part of Holt with 52 inhabitants was moved to the neighboring municipality of Dypvåg, and on 1 July 1919 another part of Holt with 14 inhabitants was moved to the neighboring municipality of Moland. During the 1960s, there were many municipal mergers across Norway due to the work of the Schei Committee. On 1 January 1960, the municipalities of Holt (population: 3,759) and Dypvåg (population: 1,805) plus the town of Tvedestrand (population: 868) were merged to form an enlarged municipality of Tvedestrand.

Name
The municipality (originally the parish) is named after the old Holt farm, since the first Holt Church was built there. The name comes from skogholt (lund) which means "grove (of trees)".

Government
All municipalities in Norway, including Holt, are responsible for primary education (through 10th grade), outpatient health services, senior citizen services, unemployment and other social services, zoning, economic development, and municipal roads. The municipality was governed by a municipal council of elected representatives, which in turn elected a mayor.

Municipal council
The municipal council  of Holt was made up of 21 representatives that were elected to four year terms.  The party breakdown of the final municipal council was as follows:

Attractions

Holt Church
Holt Church is a cruciform church dating from the 1100s. The medieval-era church was constructed of stone. In 1753, it was expanded.  The extension, choir and transepts were built of wood. The rebuilt church was also equipped with a chancel arch, decorated in the rococo style.  The church has a baptismal font made out of soapstone, carved in high Gothic style. The Baroque altarpiece from 1732 is carved with a painting of Jesus in Gethsemane.

Notable residents
Aasulv Olsen Bryggesaa, a local politician
Helga Gitmark, a local politician
Harald Selås, a local politician
Torje Olsen Solberg, a local politician

See also
List of former municipalities of Norway

References

External links

Tvedestrand
Former municipalities of Norway
1838 establishments in Norway
1960 disestablishments in Norway